XHMU-FM (branded as La Ke Buena) is a Mexican Spanish-language FM radio station that serves the Tampico, Tamaulipas market area.

History
XHMU received its concession on April 18, 1986. It started broadcasting at 31 kW ERP and has reduced its power twice in its history, once in 1991 and again in 2013.

On January 9, 2023, XHMU and XHHF-FM exchanged formats, La Ke Buena moved to 90.1

References

Radio stations in Tampico